Khodar Pore Ma is a 2012 Dhallywood action drama film directed by Shahin-Sumon. The film features Bobita, Shakib Khan, and Shahara in lead roles. It was shot in April-May 2012, and was released on Eid al-Fitr of 20 August 2012. Upon release, the film received positive reviews and was commercially successful.  Shakib Khan won the National Film Award for Best Actor for his role in the film.

Plot

Cast
 Bobita as the mother
 Shakib Khan 
 Shahara
 Misha Showdagor
 Don
 Kabila
 Nasrin

Music
The music was composed by Ali Akram Shuvo.

Accolades
At the National Film Awards for 2012, Shakib Khan won the Best Actor award for his role in Khodar Pore Ma.

References

External links
 

2012 films
2012 action drama films
Bengali-language Bangladeshi films
Bangladeshi action drama films
Films scored by Ali Akram Shuvo
2010s Bengali-language films